The Fukushima Firebonds are a professional basketball team that compete in the second division of the Japanese B.League.

History
In May 2013 Fukushima Prefecture was announced as the successful bidder for an expansion franchise to enter the 2014-15 season of the bj-league. The league management included the region's recovery from the 2011 Tōhoku earthquake and tsunami and the long-term feasibility of the bidding company, Fukushima Sports Entertainment, as reasons for the successful bid.

In June 2014, the team announced Hiroki Fujita as the inaugural head coach.

As an expansion team, the Firebonds received the first pick in the 2014-15 rookie draft, selecting forward Shota Kanno, a Fukushima Prefecture native. Takumi Masuko was selected in the second round. In July 2014 the team signed American players James Hughes and Nick Thompson as their two foreign players.

2014-15 season
The team commenced play in the bj-league in October 2014 and had their first regular-season win in a match against the Aomori Wat's on 5 October 2015. The team finished the season with a 21-31 record, securing a playoff berth in the second-last game of the regular season. They were eliminated in the first round of the playoffs 0-2 by the Iwate Big Bulls.

2015-16 season
During the off-season, the team renewed the contract of Fujita as head coach  and signed Le'Bryan Nash, Joseph Taylor and Stephan Van Treese as import players.
Masaya Karimata was named team captain and Kenya Tomori was named vice-captain.

Current roster

Notable players
Solomon Alabi
Deon Jones
Cedric Bozeman
Shaheed Davis
Verdell Jones
Bingo Merriex
Le'Bryan Nash
Tshilidzi Nephawe
Evan Ravenel
Nigel Spikes

Coaches
Hiroki Fujita
Tomohiro Moriyama
Kimitoshi Sano

Results by year

Bj-League

Arenas
Koriyama General Gymnasium
Fukushima Toyota Crown Arena
Iwaki General Gymnasium
Tamura City General Gymnasium
Aizu General Gymnasium
Shirakawa City Central Gymnasium
Inawashiro Town General Gymnasium

References

External links

 
Basketball teams in Japan
Sports teams in Fukushima Prefecture
Basketball teams established in 2013
2013 establishments in Japan